Jonathan Maurice Crathorne Stenner (born 18 January 1966) is an English gastroenterologist and a former first-class cricketer.

Stenner was born in January 1969 at RAF Newton near Bingham, Nottinghamshire. He studied medicine at Magdalene College, Cambridge. While studying at Cambridge, he made a single appearance in first-class cricket for Cambridge University against Yorkshire at Fenner's in 1988. Batting twice in the match, Stenner was dismissed for 10 runs in the Cambridge first-innings by Phil Carrick, while in their second-innings he was dismissed for 13 runs by David Towse. In addition to playing first-class cricket, he also played minor counties cricket for Cambridgeshire in 1987, making a single appearance in the Minor Counties Championship. After graduating from Cambridge, he became a doctor. Stenner currently practices as a consultant gastroenterologist at the East Surrey Hospital.

References

External links

1966 births
Living people
People from Bingham, Nottinghamshire
Cricketers from Nottinghamshire
Alumni of Magdalene College, Cambridge
English cricketers
Cambridgeshire cricketers
Cambridge University cricketers
20th-century English medical doctors
21st-century English medical doctors
British gastroenterologists